Labidi Djaouadi Ayachi (born 15 March 1938) is a Tunisian middle-distance runner. He competed in the 3000 metres steeplechase at the 1964 Summer Olympics and the 1968 Summer Olympics.

References

1938 births
Living people
Athletes (track and field) at the 1964 Summer Olympics
Athletes (track and field) at the 1968 Summer Olympics
Tunisian male middle-distance runners
Tunisian male steeplechase runners
Olympic athletes of Tunisia
Place of birth missing (living people)
Mediterranean Games silver medalists for Tunisia
Mediterranean Games medalists in athletics
Athletes (track and field) at the 1967 Mediterranean Games
20th-century Tunisian people